Ivars Knēts, (September 17, 1938, Riga, Latvia – March 1, 2019) was a rector and professor at Riga Technical University, as the Director of the Institute of Biomaterials and Biomechanics.

References

External links 
www.1mie.lv

1938 births
2019 deaths
Scientists from Riga
Riga Technical University alumni
Academic staff of Riga Technical University
Members of the European Academy of Sciences and Arts
Materials scientists and engineers
Soviet inventors
20th-century Latvian inventors
Rectors of universities in Latvia